The 1982 NatWest Trophy was an English limited overs county cricket tournament which was held between 3 July and 4 September 1982. It was the 2nd NatWest Trophy, after it had been renamed from the Gillette Cup the previous year.  The tournament was won by Surrey who defeated Warwickshire by 9 wickets in the final at Lord's.

Format
The seventeen first-class counties, were joined by five Minor Counties: Bedfordshire, Cambridgeshire, Cheshire, Durham and Norfolk.  The Ireland national cricket team also participated.  Teams who won in the first round progressed to the second round. The winners in the second round then progressed to the quarter-final stage.  Winners from the quarter-finals then progressed to the semi-finals from which the winners then went on to the final at Lord's which was held on 4 September 1982.

First round

Second round

Quarter-finals

Semi-finals

Final

References

External links
CricketArchive tournament page 

Friends Provident Trophy seasons
Natwest Trophy, 1982
NatWest Group